Wilson, Sompayrac & Urquhart was an architectural firm in South Carolina, and Wilson & Sompayrac was its successor, after Urquhart split off to form another firm.  Wilson & Sompayrac was dissolved in 1919, when Wilson returned to practicing alone and Sompayrac moved to New York City.  Both firms involved Charles Coker Wilson.

A number of the firms' works are listed on the U.S. National Register of Historic Places.

Works include:
Davidson Hall, Coker College, College Ave. Hartsville, SC (Wilson, Sompayrac,& Urquhart), NRHP-listed
First National Bank Building, 168–170 W. Main Ave. Gastonia, NC (Wilson & Sompayrac), NRHP-listed
Logan School, built 1915, 815 Elmwood Ave. Columbia, SC (Wilson & Sompayrac), NRHP-listed
Lydia Plantation, 703 W Lydia Hwy (US HWY 15/SC HWY 34) Lydia, SC (Wilson, Sompayrac & Urquhart), NRHP-listed
Memorial Hall, 2nd St. between Home Ave. and Carolina Ave. Hartsville, SC (Wilson & Sompayrac), NRHP-listed
Mt. Zion Presbyterian Church, SC 154, St. Charles Rd. Bishopville, SC (Wilson & Sompayrac), NRHP-listed
Winyah Indigo School, 1200 Highmarket St. Georgetown, SC (Wilson, Sompayrac & Urquhart), NRHP-listed
One or more works in Bishopville Commercial Historic District, N. Main St. between W. Church and Cedar Ln. and along Cedar Ln. Bishopville, SC (Wilson & Sompayrac), NRHP-listed

References

Architecture firms of the United States